Act. 5 New Action is the third and final extended play by South Korean girl group Gugudan. It was released on November 6, 2018 by Jellyfish Entertainment and distributed by CJ E&M. A music video for the title track "Not That Type", was also released on November 6. It marked the group's only record as an eight-member group since the departure of member Hyeyeon in October 2018 and their last before their disbandment on December 31, 2020.

Background and release
On October 27, Gugudan announced that they'll be returning on November 6 with their third mini album "Act.5 New Action." Their colorful first teaser photo includes member Kang Mina blowing a bubble with bubblegum. It was released on November 6, 2018. For their new concept, the group shared that they were inspired by the movie Ocean's 8.

Promotion
On November 6, Gugudan held a showcase at the Yes24 Live Hall for their comeback.

Track listing
Digital download

Charts

Weekly charts

Release history

References

Gugudan albums
2018 albums
Korean-language EPs
Jellyfish Entertainment EPs